657 Gunlöd is a dark background asteroid orbiting in the intermediate asteroid belt, approximately  in diameter. It was discovered on 23 January 1908, by astronomer August Kopff at the Heidelberg Observatory in southwest Germany. It has an albedo of around 0.042 and a rotation period of 15.7 hours.

References

External links 
 
 

Background asteroids
Gunlod
Gunlod
19080123